Témiscouata (also known as Rivière-du-Loup—Témiscouata) was a federal electoral district in Quebec, Canada, that was represented in the House of Commons of Canada from 1867 to 1979.

It was created as "Témiscouata" riding by the British North America Act, 1867. In 1959, it was renamed "Rivière-du-Loup—Témiscouata" and defined to consist of:
 the county of Témiscouata;
 the county of Rivière-du-Loup (except the parish municipalities of Notre-Dame-du-Portage and Sainte-Françoise and the municipalities of Saint-Jean-de-Dieu and Trois Pistoles) and the city of Rivière-du-Loup.

In 1966, it was redivided into the ridings of Kamouraska and Témiscouata. The new Témiscouata riding consisted of:
 the City of Rivière-du-Loup;
 the Towns of Cabano and Trois-Pistoles;
 the County of Rivière-du-Loup (except the parish municipalities of Notre-Dame-du-Portage and Saint-Antonin);
 parts of the County of Témiscouata; and
 parts of the County of Rimouski.

The riding was again renamed "Rivière-du-Loup—Témiscouata" in 1972.

Rivière-du-Loup—Témiscouata was abolished in 1976 when it was redistributed into the ridings of Kamouraska—Rivière-du-Loup and Rimouski.

Members of Parliament

This riding elected the following Members of Parliament:

Election results

Témiscouata, 1867–1962

Rivière-du-Loup—Témiscouata, 1962–1968

Témiscouata, 1968–1972

Rivière-du-Loup—Témiscouata, 1972–1979

See also 

 List of Canadian federal electoral districts
 Past Canadian electoral districts

External links 

Riding history from the Library of Parliament:
 Témiscouata (1867 - 1959)
 Rivière-du-Loup—Témiscouata (1959 - 1966)
 Témiscouata (1966 - 1972)
 Rivière-du-Loup—Témiscouata (1972 - 1976)

Former federal electoral districts of Quebec